John William "Chick" Smith (December 2, 1892 – October 11, 1935) was a pitcher in Minor and Major League Baseball. He played for the Cincinnati Reds in 1913. In 1910 and 1911, he played minor league baseball with the Concordia Travelers coached by Harry Short.

References

External links

1892 births
1935 deaths
Major League Baseball pitchers
Cincinnati Reds players
Concordia Travelers players
Baseball players from Kentucky